is the second book of Japanese artist Toriyama Sekien's famous Gazu Hyakki Yagyō tetralogy, published c. 1779. A version of the tetralogy translated and annotated in English was published in 2016. These books are supernatural bestiaries, collections of ghosts, spirits, spooks, and monsters, many of which Toriyama based on literature, folklore, other artwork. These works have had a profound influence on subsequent yōkai imagery in Japan. Konjaku Gazu Zoku Hyakki is preceded in the series by Gazu Hyakki Yagyō, and succeeded by Konjaku Hyakki Shūi and Gazu Hyakki Tsurezure Bukuro.

List of creatures 
The three volumes were titled 雨, 晦, and 明. From this book, Toriyama added captions.

First Volume – 雨 (Rain)

Second Volume – 晦 (Dark)

Third Volume – 明 (Dawn)

See also

Gazu Hyakki Tsurezure Bukuro
Gazu Hyakki Yagyō
Konjaku Hyakki Shūi

References

External links
Kon-jaku ezu zoku hyakki 
Yōkai Taikan 
Hyakki Yagyō: Mae Kōjō 

Edo-period works
Yōkai